Rap guanine nucleotide exchange factor 6 is a protein that in humans is encoded by the RAPGEF6 gene.

References

Further reading